Sir William Emerson  (3 December 1843 – 26 December 1924) was a British architect, who was President of the Royal Institute of British Architects (RIBA) from 1899 to 1902, and worked extensively in India. He was the original architect chosen to build Liverpool Cathedral.

Early life and education
Born in 1843, he was son of a silk manufacturer in Whitechapel, London, and educated at King's College, London. Around 1861, he was articled to William Gilbee Habershon, who soon thereafter entered into partnership with Alfred Robert Pite. Emerson subsequently became a pupil of William Burges.

Career

Early career 

He went to India in 1864, initially to supervise the building of Bombay school of art in Bombay to Burges’s plan, which in the event was never built. Instead he stayed on to practice architecture in Bombay, returning to London in 1869, where he opened an office in Westminster. He continued however to do his best work in India. His first big commission was for Mumbai's Gothic Crawford Market (1865–71) with a fountain executed by Rudyard Kipling's father, John Lockwood Kipling, who was also responsible for the bas-reliefs on the main entrance.

Stints in Allahabad and Bhavnagar 
Thereafter he moved to Allahabad where he designed his most important works, All Saints Cathedral, Allahabad (1869–93) and  Muir College (1872-78). He then did two buildings for the princely Bhavnagar State, Nilambag Palace (1894–95) and the Takhatsinhji Hospital (1879–83).

In 1896, he designed the Clarence Memorial Wing St. Mary's Hospital, Paddington, London

Later work and Victoria Memorial 
Eventually he designed his most known building, the Victoria Memorial (1905–21) in Calcutta.He was admitted ARIBA on 12 February 1866, his proposers being Burges, Coutts Stone and Henry Edward Kendall; and was elevated to FRIBA on 21 April 1873, his proposers being Stone, Thomas Hayter Lewis and Thomas Roger Smith. He was President of the Royal Institute of British Architects (RIBA)  from 1899 to 1902, and was knighted in the 1902 Coronation Honours, receiving the accolade from King Edward VII at Buckingham Palace on 24 October that year.

Most of his later work was in India; his most familiar being the design of the marble clad Victoria Memorial Hall in Calcutta (1905 onwards), described as "Britain's answer to the Taj Mahal". Although asked to design a building in the Italian Renaissance style, Emerson was against the exclusive use of European styles and instead incorporated Mughal elements into the structure.

He died in Shanklin, Isle of Wight in 1924.

Personal life 
He had married in 1872 Jenny, the daughter of Coutts Stone and sister of fellow architect Percy Stone.

Style 

Emerson was a pioneer of the Indo-Saracenic style, which developed in the 19th and 20th centuries in British India.

List of Buildings

 1869 - Crawford Market, Bombay (now Mumbai), India
 1870 - All Saints Cathedral, Allahabad, India
 1872 - Muir College, Allahabad 
 1878 - St Mary the Virgin Church, Brighton, Sussex
 1879 -  Takhatsinhji Hospital, Bhavnagar
 1894 -  Nilambag Palace, Bhavnagar
 1896 - Clarence Memorial Wing St. Mary's Hospital, Paddington, London
 1905 - The Victoria Memorial, Calcutta (now Kolkata), India
His design for Liverpool cathedral won first prize in the first, abortive competition in 1883.

Gallery

References

1843 births
1924 deaths
People from Whitechapel
Architects from London
Presidents of the Royal Institute of British Architects
Alumni of King's College London
Knights Bachelor
Fellows of the Royal Institute of British Architects
British people in colonial India